Muhib Rasool is a Pakistani national volleyball player, was born in the village Barapind, tehsil Shakargarh, district Narowal, Punjab, Pakistan.
He is serving in the Pakistan Police. Represented Pakistan at the Asian junior volleyball championship in Tehran on September 21, 2006.

References 

Year of birth missing (living people)
Living people
People from Barapind
Pakistani men's volleyball players